The IWA Mid-South Women's Championship is a women's professional wrestling title owned and promoted by the Independent Wrestling Association Mid-South professional wrestling promotion. The title was created on May 30, 2004 in a one night tournament titled "Volcano Girls" at the National Guard Armory in Hammond, Indiana co-promoted by IWA Mid-South Wrestling and NWA Midwest Wrestling. Until June 17, 2005, it was a joint championship with the NWA Midwest Women's Championship and was known as the NWA Midwest/IWA Mid-South Women's Championship. The championship is usually won and defended by women, although two men have once won the title such as Chuck Taylor and Lukas Jacobs. There have been a total of 24 reigns held between 17 distinctive champions and one vacancy. The current champion is Thunderkitty who is in her second reign.

Title history

Combined reigns 

See also
Independent Wrestling Association Mid-South

References

External links
 IWA Mid-South Women's Title History at Cagematch.net

Women's professional wrestling championships
IWA Mid-South championships